is a 1954 black-and-white Japanese film directed by Kimiyoshi Yasuda.

Cast 
 Ichikawa Raizō IV
 Michiko Saga
 Mitsuko Mito

References

External links 

Japanese black-and-white films
1954 films
Films directed by Kimiyoshi Yasuda
Daiei Film films
1950s Japanese films